In mathematics, strongly regular might refer to:

Strongly regular graph
Strongly regular ring, or "strongly von Neumann regular" ring